Schrankia howarthi is a species of moth of the family Erebidae. It normally occurs within the twilight to dark zone areas of lava tubes on the islands of Maui and Hawaii, however, it is sometimes found flying on the surface of both islands. The paler morph may be restricted to the dark zone of lava tubes.

The length of the forewings is 4–8 mm. Adults and larvae are active throughout the year.

The larvae mainly feed on the roots of Metrosideros polymorpha, the dominant native rainforest tree and early pioneer on new lava flows. However, cocoons and feeding damage have been observed on most types of available roots in caves, including Grevillea robusta, Eucalyptus species, Cocculus orbiculatus, pasture grasses and many unidentified roots. Larvae are also attracted to a variety of rotting baits and appear to act as scavengers in caves.

Etymology
The species is named in honour of Dr. Frank Howarth, an entomologist at the Bernice P. Bishop Museum who has pioneered Hawaiian biospeleogy. Dr Howarth first discovered this species in Kazumura Cave.

External links

Evolution of cave living in Hawaiian Schrankia (Lepidoptera: Noctuidae) with description of a remarkable new cave species

Endemic moths of Hawaii
Hypenodinae